Lakeshore Collegiate Institute (also referred to as  LCI or Lakeshore) is a high school in Toronto, Ontario, Canada. Built in 1951, Lakeshore Collegiate is a merger of New Toronto Secondary School and Alderwood Collegiate Institute. It is situated on the northwest corner of Kipling Avenue and Birmingham Street in Ward 3 of the Toronto District School Board.  It serves the New Toronto, Long Branch, Alderwood, and Mimico neighbourhoods.

History

New Toronto Secondary School was originally established on September 4, 1951 by the New Toronto Board of Education to serve the Town of New Toronto and  emphasized the technical trades, sciences, and mathematics, to support the many industries in the town at the time. The school's roots go back to 1926 when Long Branch Continuation School was established as an extension of an elementary school with six classrooms. The vocational program began in 1950 and students moved to the new high school the following year.

Another school in the area, Alderwood Collegiate Institute was also opened on September 6, 1955, with the official opening ceremony November 1955 as an academic high school.

During the 1980s, enrollment at Etobicoke public schools plummeted as many catholic transferred their children to the Catholic school system when full funding commenced. This led to the closure of many schools including Alderwood Collegiate Institute, Royal York Collegiate Institute and Mimico High School with the students of Alderwood and New Toronto were consolidated into the newly named Lakeshore Collegiate Institute which opened on September 6, 1983.

Overview

Sports
LCI has had several very accomplished sports teams including: Hockey, Baseball, Badminton, Volleyball, Golf, Tennis, Soccer. The football team was resurrected in the fall of 2005 after many years of absence.  The hockey team won the TDSSAA West Championships and qualified for OFSSAA in 2004 (Peterborough), 2006 (Timmons) and 2009 (Peterborough).  The baseball team won the TDSSAA West Championships in 2006.  The soccer team also won the TDSSAA West Region championship for the second time in Lakeshore CI's history in 2008. The first Soccer Championship occurred in 1986 when the Junior Boys' Soccer Team won the Etobicoke championship vs Martingrove Collegiate played at ECI in a shootout.  They also went on to win the TDSSAA Championship again via Penalty Shoot-out at Eglinton Flats.

In late 2009, LCI got access to the MasterCard Center of Hockey Excellence, a $34-million four-pad arena complex adjacent to the school.

In 2009, LCI's Varsity girls' soccer team won the TDSAA "AA" West Championship and qualified for OFSAA (Kenora). Also, earlier that year, the Boys' Varsity hockey team won the TDSAA "AA" Championships and qualified for OFSAA (Peterborough) as well.

Other extracurricular activities
Lakeshore Collegiate offers a wide range of extracurricular programs for students whose interests run the gamut. Among these are the Student Activity Council (or SAC), Leadership, Dance Club, Drama club, The Announcements Committee, The Yearbook Committee, sports teams, and various groups that compete in mathematics and science competitions. These programs allow students to participate in regional sporting events, practice their business skills (via the student-run "Lakestore"), and attend camps, as well as fostering both school spirit and co-operation within the student body.

One of Lakeshore Collegiate's highlights is its Drama Department. Headed by Gregory Danakas, the Drama department offers courses for grades nine through twelve. LCI has an annual stage production in which students are selected via audition. Past stage productions have featured performances of Bram Stoker's Dracula, William Shakespeare's The Taming of the Shrew, Euripides' The Bacchae, Ann-Marie MacDonald's Good Night Desdemona (Good Morning Juliet), Charles Dickens's Oliver Twist, Edmond Rostand's Cyrano de Bergerac, and John Kirkpatrick's Vacancy in Paradise. Drama at LCI offers other extracurricular opportunities, such as the Play By the Lake/Sears Drama Festival, where student directed, student acted, and often student written plays are performed, as well as the Young Company, which offers Grade 9 and 10 students the chance to perform and star in a major play before they can be a part of the Mainstage Production. As of March 9, 2007, Lakeshore has won the Best Host School Award for its district.

In recent years, the LCI music department put on concerts both for the student body and for the public.

Community involvement
One such example of this community involvement is fundraising for the local community health centre, LAMP. Another community-oriented initiative, the Clean-Up-the-Parkathon (CUTPAT), involves the cleaning of local parks and recreational spaces by the student body.

Refusing to stop at local involvement, recent efforts within the school have resulted in programs such as the TEEN project, which has taken on two sponsor children and supports their endeavours.

The annual LCI food drive in December collects food, clothes collect food, and toys for the Daily Bread Food Bank and other local food banks. Every year, donations of reach a value of several thousands of dollars. It has become a "competition" to see which teacher's homeroom class would collect the most items. LCI made a recent contribution of over 1,000 pounds of fresh produce donated to the Daily Bread Food Bank harvested from LCI's Community Garden.

Notable graduates
Adam Copeland, Former WWE Wrestler known as Edge
Manny Fernandez, NHL player
Trish Stratus, Former WWE Diva
Zdvravko Kukolic, Bank Executive

See also
List of high schools in Ontario

References

External links
Lakeshore Collegiate Institute
TDSB Profile

Educational institutions established in 1983
Education in Etobicoke
High schools in Toronto
Schools in the TDSB
1983 establishments in Ontario